Tang-e Chowgan-e Olya-ye Kashkuli (also Romanized as Tang-e Chowgān-e ‘Olyā-ye Kashkūlī) is a village in Shapur Rural District, in the Central District of Kazerun County, Fars Province, Iran. At the 2006 census, its population was 326, in 79 families.

References 

Populated places in Kazerun County